SMS Frankfurt was a light cruiser of the  built by the German Kaiserliche Marine (Imperial Navy). She had one sister ship, ; the ships were very similar to the previous s. The ship was laid down in 1913, launched in March 1915, and completed by August 1915.

Frankfurt saw extensive action with the High Seas Fleet during World War I. She served primarily in the North Sea, and participated in the Bombardment of Yarmouth and Lowestoft and the battles of Jutland and Second Heligoland. At Jutland, she was lightly damaged by a British cruiser and her crew suffered minor casualties. At the end of the war, she was interned with the bulk of the German fleet in Scapa Flow. When the fleet was scuttled in June 1919, Frankfurt was one of the few ships that were not successfully sunk. She was ceded to the US Navy as a war prize and ultimately expended as a bomb target in tests conducted by the US Navy and Army Air Force in July 1921.

Design

She displaced  at full load. Her propulsion system consisted of two sets of Marine steam turbines driving two  screw propellers. They were designed to give . These were powered by ten coal-fired Marine-type water-tube boilers and two oil-fired double-ended boilers. Frankfurt had a crew of 17 officers and 457 enlisted men.

The ship was armed with a main battery of eight  SK L/45 guns in single pedestal mounts. Two were placed side by side forward on the forecastle, four were located amidships, two on either side, and two were placed in a superfiring pair aft. They were supplied with 1,024 rounds of ammunition, for 128 shells per gun. The ship's antiaircraft armament initially consisted of four  L/55 guns, though these were replaced with a pair of  SK L/45 anti-aircraft guns. She was also equipped with four  torpedo tubes with eight torpedoes. Two were submerged in the hull on the broadside and two were mounted on the deck amidships. She could also carry 120 mines.

Service history
Frankfurt was ordered under the contract name "Ersatz " and was laid down at the Kaiserliche Werft shipyard in Kiel in 1913 and launched on 20 March 1915, after which fitting-out work commenced. She was commissioned into the High Seas Fleet on 20 August 1915, after being rushed through sea trials. The first operation in which Frankfurt saw action was the Bombardment of Yarmouth and Lowestoft on 24 April 1916. Frankfurt was assigned to the reconnaissance screen for the battlecruisers of I Scouting Group, temporarily under the command of Konteradmiral Friedrich Boedicker's. During the raid, Frankfurt attacked and sank a British armed patrol boat off the English coast. Due to reports of British submarines and torpedo attacks, Boedicker broke off the chase, and turned back east towards the High Seas Fleet. At this point, the German fleet commander, Vice Admiral Reinhard Scheer, who had been warned of the Grand Fleet's sortie from Scapa Flow, turned back towards Germany.

Battle of Jutland

At the Battle of Jutland on 31 May – 1 June 1916, Frankfurt served as Boedicker's flagship, the commander of II Scouting Group. II Scouting Group was again screening for the I Scouting Group battlecruisers, again commanded by Vizeadmiral Franz von Hipper. Frankfurt was engaged in the first action of the battle, when the cruiser screens of the German and British battlecruiser squadrons encountered each other. Frankfurt, and  briefly fired on the British light cruisers at 16:17 until the British ships turned away. Half an hour later, the fast battleships of the 5th Battle Squadron had reached the scene and opened fire on Frankfurt and the other German cruisers, though the ships quickly fled under a smokescreen and were not hit.

Shortly before 18:00, the British destroyers  and  attempted to attack the German battlecruisers. Heavy fire from Frankfurt and Pillau forced the British ships to break off the attack. At around 18:30, Frankfurt and the rest of II Scouting Group encountered the cruiser ; they opened fire and scored several hits on the ship. Rear Admiral Horace Hood's three battlecruisers intervened, however, and scored a hit on  that disabled the ship. About an hour later, Canterbury scored four hits on Frankfurt in quick succession: two  hits in the area of Frankfurts mainmast and a pair of  hits. One of the 4-inch shells hit forward, well above the waterline, and the second exploded in the water near the stern and damaged both screws.

Frankfurt and Pillau spotted the cruiser  and several destroyers shortly before 23:00. They each fired a torpedo at the British cruiser before turning back toward the German line without using their searchlights or guns to avoid drawing the British toward the German battleships. Almost two hours later, Frankfurt encountered a pair of British destroyers and fired on them briefly until they retreated at full speed. By 04:00 on 1 June, the German fleet had evaded the British fleet and reached Horns Reef. Frankfurt had three men killed and eighteen wounded in the course of the engagement. She had fired 379 rounds of 15 cm ammunition and a pair of 8.8 cm shells, and launched a single torpedo.

Subsequent operations
The ship participated in Operation Albion in October 1917, an operation to eliminate the Russian naval forces that still held the Gulf of Riga. The ship was part of II Scouting Group, commanded by Rear Admiral Ludwig von Reuter. The following month, Frankfurt and the rest of II Scouting Group were engaged during the Second Battle of Heligoland Bight. Along with three other cruisers from II Scouting Group, Königsberg escorted minesweepers clearing paths in minefields laid by the British. The dreadnought battleships  and  stood by in distant support. During the battle, Frankfurt fired torpedoes at the attacking British cruisers, but failed to score any hits. The British broke off the attack when the German battleships arrived on the scene, after which the Germans also withdrew.

At 19:08 on 21 October 1918, Frankfurt accidentally rammed and sank the U-boat UB-89 in Kiel-Holtenau, killing seven of her crew. Twenty-seven survivors were pulled from the water. UB-89 was raised by the salvage tug  on 30 October but with the war almost over, she was not repaired and did not see further service.

In the final weeks of the war, Scheer and Hipper intended to inflict as much damage as possible on the British navy, in order to secure a better bargaining position for Germany, whatever the cost to the fleet. On the morning of 29 October 1918, the order was given to sail from Wilhelmshaven the following day. The unrest ultimately forced Hipper and Scheer to cancel the operation. Most of the High Seas Fleet's ships, including Frankfurt, were interned in the British naval base in Scapa Flow, under the command of Reuter.

Fate

The fleet remained in captivity during the negotiations that ultimately produced the Versailles Treaty. Reuter believed that the British intended to seize the German ships on 21 June 1919, which was the deadline for Germany to have signed the peace treaty. Unaware that the deadline had been extended to the 23rd, Reuter ordered the ships to be sunk at the next opportunity. On the morning of 21 June, the British fleet left Scapa Flow to conduct training maneuvers, and at 11:20 Reuter transmitted the order to scuttle his ships. British sailors boarded Frankfurt and beached her before she could sink. She was raised the following month and thereafter transferred to the United States Navy as a war prize.

She was formally taken over on 11 March 1920 in England and commissioned into the US Navy on 4 June. The three minesweepers then towed three ex-German torpedo boats in company with Ostfriesland and Frankfurt; the convoy then crossed the Atlantic to the New York Navy Yard. There, the ships were thoroughly inspected by naval engineers to determine the advantages and disadvantages of the German ships, with the goal of incorporating any lessons learned into future American designs. While there, she also had her watertight compartments completely sealed to improve her ability to remain afloat when damaged.

In July 1921, the Army Air Service and the US Navy conducted a series of bombing tests off Cape Henry, Virginia, led by General Billy Mitchell. The targets included demobilized American and former German warships, including the old battleship , Frankfurt, and Ostfriesland. Frankfurt was scheduled for tests conducted on 18 July. The attacks started with small  and  bombs, which caused minor hull damage. The bombers then changed over to larger  and  bombs; Army Air Service Martin MB-2 bombers hit Frankfurt with several of the 600 lb bombs and sank the ship at 18:25.

Footnotes

References

Further reading
 
 

Wiesbaden-class cruisers
Ships built in Kiel
1915 ships
World War I cruisers of Germany
Maritime incidents in 1918
Maritime incidents in 1919
Maritime incidents in 1921
Cruisers sunk by aircraft as targets
World War I warships scuttled at Scapa Flow
Ships sunk by US aircraft
Shipwrecks of the Virginia coast